The Verse of Us. also known as Chinese Verses, is a 2015 Chinese feature documentary film directed by Xiaoyu Qin and Feiyue Wu. The documentary follows working class poets in China. The film was released in China by China Film Group Corporation on November 1, 2015. It was also released internationally and has won multiple awards.

Reception
The film grossed  at the Chinese box office.

Awards

References

External links

2015 films
Chinese documentary films
2015 documentary films
China Film Group Corporation films
Chinese-language films